Zeidora maoria is a species of small sea snail, specifically a keyhole limpet, a marine gastropod mollusc in the family Fissurellidae, the keyhole limpets.

References

 Powell A W B, William Collins Publishers Ltd, Auckland 1979 

Fissurellidae
Gastropods of New Zealand
Gastropods described in 1937